Major Lazer is an American adult animated television series based on the electronic music group of the same name, created by DJ and record producer Diplo with Ferry Gouw and Kevin Kusatsu. It premiered on FXX on April 16, 2015, as part of their Animation Domination High-Def (ADHD) block. After Stone Quackers, Major Lazer is the second ADHD original series to be aired on the channel after FOX had stopped its broadcast of the block itself.

The show was renewed for a second season, but was later canceled. On September 3, 2016, it was announced that John Boyega had left the series to focus on the new Star Wars films prior to its cancellation. The show is now available to stream on Hulu.

Plot
Set in the future, Major Lazer is a Jamaican superhero with a laser gun for a right hand who fights against the dystopian forces led by Jamaica's leader President Whitewall and his servant General Rubbish. Major Lazer is assisted in his fight by President Whitewall's daughter Penny Whitewall and hacker Blkmrkt.

Production
Major Lazer had been in production for nearly five years before its premiere. It was originally considered for Adult Swim through a pilot episode produced in 2011 by Williams Street and Titmouse, Inc., which was never broadcast. The musical group Major Lazer, on which the show is based, previously starred animated characters, including the character of Major Lazer. Ferry Gouw, along with John Pham, served as art director for this incarnation. Other musicians such as Jay Z, and the Odd Future collective, had signed on for television shows on the network during the year; Odd Future's came out as Loiter Squad the next year. Billboard announced Major Lazer would premiere on Fox in 2014. Cat Power and Riff Raff were said to have collaborated on the soundtrack for the show.

In 2015, Billboard announced the show would premiere on FXX. Diplo called the long wait of the production "worth it to have such a succinct TV show for our music fans and cartoon fans alike". He said that it would appeal to "any fans of hip-hop [and] electronic music or '80s cartoons, and the culture that gave birth to [Major Lazer's] musical landscape". Adewale Akinnuoye-Agbaje, who voices the eponymous character, described the feeling of the show as "like being high". J. K. Simmons voices President Whitewall, while Aziz Ansari, Ezra Koenig, Riff Raff, Andy Samberg, and Charli XCX make guest voice performances.

Voice cast

Principal cast
 Adewale Akinnuoye-Agbaje – Major Lazer, Evil Lazer (ep. 10)
 James Adomian – General Rubbish
 John Boyega – Blkmrkt
 Ashante "Taranchyla" Reid – Old Rasta, PG Tipps, Weed Man (Episode 1)
 J. K. Simmons – President Whitewall
 Angela Trimbur – Penny Whitewall

Additional voices
 Trinidad James – Mr. Mary James (episode 1), Goldie (episode 9)
 Tiësto – DJ God (episode 2)
 Jonathan Banks – The Law (episode 2)
 Andy Samberg – Dr. Nerd/Dr. Bass Drop (episodes 2–3)
 Riff Raff – Double Cup (episode 4), Additional Voices (episode 7)
 Udo Kier – Head Vampire Vampire (episode 5)
 Ezra Koenig – Ryland (episode 5)
 Matt Berry – Professor Teacher (episodes 6–7)
 Jorma Taccone – Spooky Dookie (episode 6), Killscreen (episode 8), K-Pop (episode 10)
 Aziz Ansari – Goosh (episode 7)
 Heather Anne Campbell – Game Tournament Worker (episode 8)
 Kumail Nanjiani – Thor (episode 8)
 Ferry Gouw – Kamikaze (episode 9)
 Clyde Kusatsu – Store Owner (episode 9)
 Chan Marshall – Knife Fight (episode 9)
 Mike Skinner – Block Head (episode 9)
 Charli XCX – Lady Vanessa Rothchild (episode 11)

Episodes

Pilot (2011)

Series (2015)

Broadcast and reception
The show premiered on April 16, 2015. The Major Lazer group's third album was expected to be released near the same date, but was moved to June 1. A special preview of the show was broadcast on October 27, 2014, on FXX. Erik Adams of The A.V. Club graded the series with an B, praising its visuals reminiscent of the "chunky outlines, washed-out colors, and fantastical content of '80s Saturday-morning fare" while calling the writing solid yet familiar.

In 2016, Teletoon at Night broadcast the show at 11:15pm EST in Canada.

Explanatory notes

References

Further reading

External links
 

Major Lazer
2010s American adult animated television series
2010s American music television series
2010s American science fiction television series
2015 American television series debuts
2015 American television series endings
American adult animated action television series
American adult animated musical television series
American adult animated science fiction television series
American adult animated superhero television series
Animation based on real people
English-language television shows
FXX original programming
Television series based on singers and musicians
Television series by 20th Century Fox Television
Television series by Fox Television Animation